Josef Johann Mann (19 May 1804 – 20 March 1889), or Johann Josef Ritter von Mann, was a German Bohemian entomologist and a specialist in Lepidoptera.

Mann was born in Jablonné v Podještědí, Bohemia (present-day Czech Republic). He was a painter, expedition collector and preparator at the Hofkabinet in Vienna, Austria. Mann worked with the curator Alois Friedrich Rogenhofer. He died in Vienna.

Bibliography 
 Mann, J.: 1855, Die Lepidopteren gesammelt auf einer entomologischen Reise in Corsika. Verh. zool. – bot. Ver. Wien, 5: 529 – 572.
 Mann, J.: 1866, Aufzählung der in Jahre 1865 in der Dobrudscha gesammelter Schmetterlinge. Verh. zool. – bot. ges.., 16, 1 – 40.
 Mann, J.: 1866, Josef Emanuel Fischer Edler von Rösslerstamm. Nachruf. Verh. Zool. – Bot.Ges., 16, 51 – 54.
 Mann, J.: 1867, Schmetterlinge gesammelt im Jahre 1866 um Josefstahl in der kroatischen Militärgrenze. Verh. zool. – bot. ges., 17, 63 – 67, Wien.
 Mann, J.: 1872, Verzeichniss der im Jahre 1851 bei Brussa in Kleinasien gesammelten Schmetterlinge. Wien ent. Monatschr., 6: 356 – 371, 373 – 409.

References 
 Hesselbarth, G. & Oorschot, H. van & Wagener, S.: 1995, Die Schmetterlinge der Türkei, Band 2: 1179 – 1199.
 Poggi, R. &. Conci, C.: 1996, Mem. Soc. ent. Ital., 75, 69 
 Rákosy, L.: 1996, Die Noctuiden Rumäniens (Lepidoptera: Noctuidae) Stapfia 46, 9 – 10 + portrait.
 Nonveiller, G.: 1999, The Pioneers of the Research on the Insects of Dalmatia: 205 – 206, 212 – 214 + portrait. 
 Gaedike, R. & Groll, E. K. eds. 2001, Entomologen der Welt (Biografien, Sammlungsverbleib). Datenbank, DEI Eberswalde im ZALF e. V.: „Mann Josef Johann“.

External links

1804 births
1889 deaths
People from Jablonné v Podještědí
German Bohemian people
Austrian knights
German lepidopterists
German people of German Bohemian descent